Reducción de Nuestra Señora de Santa Ana (Reduction of Our Lady of Saint Ana) was one of the many colonial missions for Indian Reductions founded in the 17th century by the Jesuits in South America during the Spanish colonial period.

The mission was within the colonial Province of Paraguay.  Its present-day ruins are located in Misiones Province, Argentina.

Jesuit Missions of the Guaranis 
The Spanish relocated the indigenous Guaraní people from their home villages to the reduction sites, where they established mission centers. These generally were modeled on Spanish rural villages, complete with a town square bounded by a church and administrative buildings. Nuestra Señora de Santa Ana was founded in 1633, and is located in the present-day Candelaria Department of the Misiones Province, Argentina.

It is 2 kilometers from Santa Ana, the chief city of the Candelaria Department. The ruins of Nuestra Señora de Santa Ana are not far from the reduccion site of San Ignacio Miní. Like most settlements of the era, the reducciones were located along waterways, which supplied drinking and washing water, and were used for transportation and trade.

In 1984 Mission Nuestra Señora de Santa Ana was one of four sites of Jesuit reductions in Argentina and one in Brazil to be declared  by UNESCO the  World Heritage Sites.

See also 

 Governorate of the Río de la Plata
 Viceroyalty of the Río de la Plata
 List of Jesuit sites

References

External links 

Jesuit Missions of the Guaranis
Buildings and structures in Misiones Province
Spanish missions in Argentina
1633 establishments in the Viceroyalty of Peru 
Former populated places in Argentina
Tourist attractions in Misiones Province
World Heritage Sites in Argentina